Doliwa is a Polish coat of arms. It was used by several szlachta families in the times of the Polish–Lithuanian Commonwealth.

History

Blazon
Azure, on a bend sinister Argent, three roses proper.

Notable bearers
Notable bearers of this coat of arms include:
 Mikhail Dolivo-Dobrovolsky  – engineer and inventor

See also
 Polish heraldry
 Heraldry
 Coat of arms

Polish coats of arms